Stoykov (also appearing in the transliteration variants Stoikov, Stojkov, Stoikow or Stoykow) – with its female form Stoykova – is a Bulgarian surname which is derived from the male given name Stoyko (also as Stojko—also found in Slovenian—or Stoiko), which in itself comes from the imperative form стой of the Bulgarian verb стоя "to stand", "to stop." 

Notable people with the name Stoykov include:

Angel Stoykov (born 1977), former Bulgarian footballer
Dame Stoykov (born 1968), Bulgarian judoka
Elvis Stojko (born 1972), Canadian figure skater of Slovenian ancestry
Georgi Stoykov Rakovski (1821–1867), Bulgarian revolutionary, freemason and writer 
Kostadin Stoykov (born 1977), former Bulgarian volleyball player
Krasimir Stoykov (born 1955), former Bulgarian swimmer
Lubomir Stoykov (born 1954), Bulgarian fashion TV journalist and fashion critic
Maksim Stoykov (born 1991), Bulgarian footballer
Stoyko Stoykov (1912–1969), Bulgarian linguist
Todor Stoykov (born 1977), Bulgarian retired basketball player
Veselin Stoykov (born 1986), Bulgarian footballer
Vesselin Stoykov (born 1973), German opera singer and manager of Bulgarian origin
Yordan Stoykov (born 1951), Bulgarian retired football player and manager
Zlatan Stoykov (born 1951), Bulgarian general

References

Bulgarian-language surnames